Karuzi is a city located in eastern Burundi. It is the capital city of Karuzi Province.

On 8 June 2020, Burundian president Pierre Nkurunziza died in Karuzi from cardiac arrest.

Populated places in Burundi
Karuzi Province